John Mitchell Lounsbery (March 9, 1911 – February 13, 1976) was an American animator and director who worked for Walt Disney Productions. He is best known as one of Disney's Nine Old Men, of which he was the shortest lived as well as the first to die.

Life and career
He was born on March 9, 1911, in Cincinnati, Ohio, and raised in Colorado. He attended East Denver High School and the Art Institute of Denver. While attending the ArtCenter College of Design in Los Angeles, an instructor sent him to interview with Walt Disney.

Lounsbery was hired by Disney on July 2, 1935, beginning as an assistant animator on Snow White and the Seven Dwarfs (uncredited). He went on to work on numerous short features in the 1940s while continuing to serve as part of the animating team on nearly all of Disney's most famous feature-length animated films. In the 1970s, he was promoted to director and directed the short film Winnie the Pooh and Tigger Too and The Rescuers.

Lounsbery died on February 13, 1976, at his age of 64. At the time of his death, he was working on The Rescuers and still directing at the Walt Disney Studios. He was named a Disney Legend in 1989 and was buried at the Forest Lawn, Hollywood Hills Cemetery in Los Angeles.

Filmography

External links

Disney Legends profile

Animators from Ohio
1911 births
1976 deaths
American animated film directors
Artists from Cincinnati
Film directors from Ohio
Walt Disney Animation Studios people
Burials at Forest Lawn Memorial Park (Hollywood Hills)